The following list contains persons of note who were born, raised, or spent portions of their lives in the American Commonwealth of Kentucky.

Authors and journalists

Explorers, pioneers, and military personnel

Film, radio, and television personalities

Government and political leaders

Infamous persons

Musicians

Scientists and inventors

Sports figures

Visual artists

Other notable persons

See also

 List of Kentucky women in the civil rights era
 List of people from Lexington, Kentucky
 List of people from the Louisville metropolitan area

References